Berruornis orbisantiqui was an early fossil owl or owl-like bird recovered from late Paleocene deposits in the region of Reims in northeastern France. It was about the size of a Eurasian eagle-owl (Bubo bubo).

References

Owls
Paleocene birds
Fossils of France
Fossil taxa described in 1994
Prehistoric bird genera